Coelogorgia is a monotypic genus of corals belonging to the monotypic family Coelogorgiidae. The only species is Coelogorgia palmosa.

The species is found in Malesia, Madagascar.

References

Octocorallia genera
Coelogorgiidae
Monotypic cnidarian genera